Because I Said So  is a 2007 American romantic comedy film directed by Michael Lehmann and starring Diane Keaton, Mandy Moore, Lauren Graham, Piper Perabo, Gabriel Macht, Tom Everett Scott and Stephen Collins. It was released on February 2, 2007. It was panned by critics, some calling it the worst movie of the year.

Plot
Daphne (Diane Keaton), is the loving but over-bearing mother of three women. Her daughters Maggie (Lauren Graham) and Mae (Piper Perabo) are happily married, but her youngest, Milly (Mandy Moore), recently broke up with her boyfriend, and Daphne is concerned.

Daphne fears that her daughter cannot find a good man on her own, so she secretly places a personal ad on her behalf. She finds a potential candidate, Jason (Tom Everett Scott), and tries to orchestrate a chance meeting of the two. The plan seems flawless until Milly finds her own date, guitarist Johnny (Gabriel Macht), who happens to be a candidate Daphne had previously rejected. Milly is unaware of her mother's scheming and begins relationships with both Jason and Johnny at the same time, with neither aware of the other.

Inevitably, this double-dating takes its toll and Milly becomes estranged from both Jason and Johnny. Meanwhile, Daphne stumbles upon her own perfect match after being alone for many years, and Milly realizes she has to choose between being the daughter her mother wants her to be and being the woman she wants herself to be. Choosing the latter leads to a row with her mother, but when Milly reconciles with Johnny, Daphne comes to realize that this is the relationship that was meant to be in the first place.

Cast

Marketing
The film has a marketing tie-in allowing customers to buy panties with different sayings from the movie.

Reception

Box office
In its first weekend of release, the film placed second in total box office receipts. For the weekend of February 2, 2007, the film earned $13,022,000. As of April 5, 2007; its domestic gross was $42,674,040. According to Box Office Guru, "men showed practically zero interest in the Universal release. Studio research showed that 82% of the audience was female. 55% of the turnout was 35 or older. 83% was Caucasian."

Critical reception
  Audiences polled by CinemaScore gave the film an average grade of "A" on an A+ to F scale. William Booth of the Washington Post rated it the worst movie of 2007.

Diane Keaton's performance in the film earned her a Golden Raspberry Award nomination for Worst Actress, where she lost to Lindsay Lohan for I Know Who Killed Me.

References

External links
 
 
 

2007 films
2007 romantic comedy films
American romantic comedy films
2000s English-language films
Films about weddings
Films directed by Michael Lehmann
Universal Pictures films
Films about dysfunctional families
Films about online dating
Films scored by David Kitay
Gold Circle Films films
Films about mother–daughter relationships
2000s American films